Symphony No. 18 can refer to:

Symphony No. 18 (Mozart)
Symphony No. 18 (Haydn)
Symphony No. 18 (Michael Haydn)

018